Neha Marda is an Indian television actress. She is well known for her roles in Balika Vadhu, Doli Armaano Ki and Kyun Rishton Mein Katti Batti. In 2015, she participated in Jhalak Dikhhla Jaa.

Life and career

1991–2008: Early life and acting debut 
Marda was born in either 1986, 1987, or 1991. She was brought up in a Marwari family in a district town near Kolkata. Neha is a native of Rajasthan.

Marda was first recognized when she participated in Sony TV's Boogie Woogie as a contestant and became the winner in 2004. She was a part of the show when she was 11, 17 and 19 and judged for an episode when she was 21. In 2005, she made her acting debut in Sahara One's Saath Rahega Always. After the show went off air she played Shruti in Ghar Ek Sapnaa.

In 2006, she appeared in Zee TV's Mamta as Simran. In 2007, she acted in Ssshhhh...Koi Hai in an episodic appearance followed by acting in Ekta Kapoor's Kahe Naa Kahe as Manvi.

2008–2015: Breakthrough with Balika Vadhu and Doli Armaanon Ki 
In 2008, she played the main lead as Priyamvada in Zee TV's Ek Thi Rajkumari opposite Ali Merchant. Marda's breakthrough came when she landed the role of Gehna in Colors TV's longest running show, Balika Vadhu which she played from 2008 until 2011. In 2009, she played the lead in Jo Ishq Ki Marzi Woh Rab Ki Marzi opposite Neil Bhatt. From 2009 until 2010, Marda played the negative role of Pratima in Star Plus's Shraddha.

In 2010, participated in Imagine TV's Meethi Choori No 1. In January 2011, she appeared as a guest contestant in Jhalak Dikhhla Jaa 4 where she was paired with contestant Meiyang Chang. In 2011, she participated in Kitchen Champion 4 and Nachle Ve with Saroj Khan. Marda later acted in shows like Ek Hazaaron Mein Meri Behna Hai (2012) and Devon Ke Dev...Mahadev (2013).

Marda was cast in Zee TV's Doli Armaano Ki, playing the lead role as Urmi opposite Mohit Malik. In 2015, Marda quit the show getting replaced by Manasi Salvi. The show ended on 25 September 2015.

2015–present: Jhalak Dikhhla Jaa and further projects 
In September 2015, after leaving Doli Armaano Ki, Marda participated in Colors TV's dance reality show Jhalak Dikhhla Jaa in its eighth season. She entered as a wild card entrant along with Anita Hassanandani and Roopal Tyagi. She, along with her choreographer Rajit Dev had got eliminated after two weeks. In 2016, she participated in Box Cricket League 2 where she joined Karan Wahi's team, 'Delhi Draggons'. In 2017, she appeared as a guest contestant in Fear Factor: Khatron Ke Khiladi 8 for the teen ka tadka special week and performed along with Hina Khan.

In 2018, she joined Zee TV's Piya Albela playing Bella. Later she appeared in an episodic role of Genda in &TV's Laal Ishq opposite Sartaj Gill. In 2019, she participated in Khatra Khatra Khatra. Since 2020, Marda has been playing the lead role as Shubhra in Zee TV's Kyun Rishton Mein Katti Batti opposite Siddhaanth Vir Surryavanshi.
Neha Quit Kyun Rishton Mein Katti Batti on 13 October 2021 due to her Personal Issues.The makers decided to take a leap in a show where Neha was Supposed to play the role of Her Character Shubra's daughter in the show
but when she decided to quit the makers decided to pull off the plug of the show in December 2021.

Other work 
On 1 July 2018, she founded an academy in Patna known as the Royal Opera House Academy(ROHA) that provides training in dance, drama and singing to performing arts enthusiasts.

Neha Marda is popularly known as 'Gehna' for her role in the Balika Vadhu series. In an interview, Neha said, "she watched the CDs of Bandit Queen to get into the skin of her character Gehna in Balika Vadhu."

Personal life 
On 10 February 2012, in Kolkata, she married Ayushman Agrawal, a Patna-based businessman, in an arranged marriage.

Television

Awards and nominations

Notes

References

External links

 
 

Living people
Indian television actresses
Year of birth missing (living people)